At the 1968 Summer Olympics, 16 wrestling events were contested, for all men. There were eight weight classes in Greco-Roman wrestling and eight classes in freestyle wrestling.

Medal summary

Freestyle

Greco-Roman

Medal table

Participating nations

A total of 297 wrestlers from 46 nations competed at the Mexico City Games:

See also
List of World and Olympic Champions in men's freestyle wrestling
List of World and Olympic Champions in Greco-Roman wrestling

References

External links
 

 
1968 Summer Olympics events
1968